Viscount Lisburne is a title that has been created twice, both times in the Peerage of Ireland. The first creation came in 1685 in favour of Adam Loftus, along with the subsidiary title of Baron of Rathfarnam. These titles became extinct upon his death in 1691 at the siege of Limerick. The second creation came in 1695 in favour of John Vaughan. For more information on this creation, see Earl of Lisburne.

Viscounts Lisburne (1685)
Adam Loftus, 1st Viscount Lisburne (1647–1691) and Baron Rathfarnham

Viscounts Lisburne (1695)
see Earl of Lisburne

References

Viscountcies in the Peerage of Ireland
Extinct viscountcies in the Peerage of Ireland
1685 establishments in the British Empire
Noble titles created in 1685
Noble titles created in 1695